Robert Loren "Duck" Dowell (August 14, 1912 – November 27, 2003) was an American professional basketball player for the Akron Firestone Non-Skids in the United States' National Basketball League during the 1937–38 season. After an All-American collegiate career at Northwest Missouri State, Dowell also competed in the Amateur Athletic Union (AAU) for the Denver Piggly Wigglies.

Dowell also served as Pepperdine University's head coach for the men's basketball and football teams. As the basketball coach, he compiled an overall record of 263 wins and 263 losses between 1948–49 and 1967–68. Pepperdine won the California Collegiate Athletic Association titles for four consecutive seasons, from 1950 to 1953.  His 1961–62 squad won the West Coast Conference and advanced the 1962 NCAA Tournament's West Regional semifinal round. Dowell also coached the football team during the 1951 and 1952 seasons, which are described as "rebuilding" years in the school's football archive.

Head coaching record

College football

References

External links
 

1912 births
2003 deaths
Akron Firestone Non-Skids players
Amateur Athletic Union men's basketball players
American men's basketball players
Basketball coaches from Missouri
Basketball players from Missouri
Centers (basketball)
Forwards (basketball)
High school basketball coaches in the United States
Junior college men's basketball coaches in the United States
Northwest Missouri State Bearcats football players
Northwest Missouri State Bearcats men's basketball players
People from Daviess County, Missouri
People from Harrison County, Missouri
Pepperdine Waves athletic directors
Pepperdine Waves football coaches
Pepperdine Waves men's basketball coaches